Cody Hollister (born November 18, 1993) is an American football wide receiver for the Tennessee Titans of the National Football League (NFL). He played college football at Arkansas.

Professional career

New England Patriots
Hollister signed with the New England Patriots as an undrafted free agent on May 5, 2017. He was waived by the Patriots on September 2, 2017 and was signed to the practice squad the next day. He signed a reserve/future contract with the Patriots on February 6, 2018.

On July 24, 2018, Hollister was waived by the Patriots with a non-football injury designation. After Hollister cleared waivers and reverted to the Patriots' non-football injury list, it was later revealed that he would undergo back surgery. Hollister and his brother won Super Bowl LIII when the Patriots defeated the Los Angeles Rams 13-3.

Tennessee Titans
On May 13, 2019, Hollister signed with the Tennessee Titans. He was waived on August 31, 2019 and was signed to the practice squad the next day. He was promoted to the active roster on November 9, 2019.

On September 15, 2020, Hollister was waived by the Titans and re-signed to the practice squad two days later. He was elevated to the active roster on October 13 for the team's week 5 game against the Buffalo Bills, and reverted to the practice squad after the game. He was placed on the practice squad/COVID-19 list by the team on December 19, 2020, and restored to the practice squad on December 30.

He was signed to a futures contract by the Titans on January 11, 2021. He was placed on injured reserve on August 7, 2021. He was released on August 17. He was signed to the Titans practice squad on November 16. He was activated from the practice squad and played against the New England Patriots on November 28, 2021.

After the Titans were eliminated in the Divisional Round of the 2021 playoffs, Hollister signed a reserve/future contract on January 24, 2022. On December 5, 2022, he was placed on injured reserve.

Personal life
Hollister is the twin brother of Jacob Hollister, a tight end for the Las Vegas Raiders.

References

External links
Tennessee Titans bio
Arkansas Razorbacks bio

1993 births
Living people
Players of American football from Oregon
Sportspeople from Bend, Oregon
American football wide receivers
Arkansas Razorbacks football players
New England Patriots players
Tennessee Titans players
Twin sportspeople
American twins